The Khyber Pakhtunkhwa Department of Agriculture ((Urdu) is charged with administering agricultural programs in the Pakistani province of Khyber Pakhtunkhwa, a mountainous region in the northern part of the country. The department is headed by the Minister of Agriculture, who is a member of the Chief Minister's Cabinet.

This position is currently held by Mr. Ikram Ullah Khan, who was appointed Minister of Agriculture by Chief Minister of KP Pervez Khattak on May 7, 2014.

History 

Created on August 14, 1973, the department's mission is to create jobs, promote agricultural growth, encourage sustainable development and improve living standards for the Khyber Pakhtunkhwa province.

Organization 

The department is under the control and supervision of the Khyber Pakhtunkhwa Minister for Agriculture, a political appointee of the Chief Minister of Khyber Pakhtunkhwa. The Secretary of Agriculture, also appointed by the Chief Minister, assists the Agriculture Minister in managing the department and assumes the duties of the Minister in his absence.

Structure 

 Minister of Agriculture
 Secretary of Agriculture
 Special Secretary of Agriculture
 Additional Secretary of Agriculture
 Deputy Secretary of Agriculture
 SO Accounts & Cooperatives
 SO Agriculture
 SO Administration
 SO Establishment
 SO Litigation
 SO Livestock & Fisheries
 Chief Planning Officer
 Deputy Director Planning Agriculture
 Deputy Director Monitoring & Planning
 Assistant Director Planning
 Planning Officer
 Assistant Statistical Officer
 Agribusiness Officer

Duties 

Ministry roles include assessing emerging agriculture conditions, and emerging concerns in the Khyber Pakhtunkhwa area. Additional roles include advising the Chief Minister of agriculture-related matters. The Minister of Agriculture applies Department of Agriculture policies to carry out approved programs and generates public awareness of the department's policies.

See also
Agricultural Training Institute, Peshawar

References 

Departments of Government of Khyber Pakhtunkhwa
Ministries established in 1973
1973 establishments in Pakistan
Khyber Pakhtunkhwa